The Stephen P. Clark Government Center, known also as Government Center, Miami-Dade Center, or County Hall, is a skyscraper in the Government Center district of Downtown Miami, Florida, United States. It is the headquarters building of the Miami-Dade County government. Many county offices are located in or near the building. The local and federal courthouses are located within five blocks of the building. The tower is 510 ft (155 m) tall, and has 28 stories. It has one of the highest height-to-floor ratios of any skyscraper, at 18.2 feet (5.5 m) per floor. The Government Center Metro Station is located inside the building, giving it easy access to public transit. It is located in western downtown, on North First Street between West First and West Second Avenue. The building was completed in 1985. It is named after the former Mayor of Miami-Dade County and Mayor of Miami, Stephen P. Clark (1923-1996).

See also
Government of Miami-Dade County
Government Center (MDT station)
List of tallest buildings in Miami

External links 

Stephen P. Clark Center on Emporis

Government of Miami-Dade County, Florida
County government buildings in Florida
County government in Florida
Government buildings completed in 1985
Headquarters in the United States
Skyscraper office buildings in Miami
1985 establishments in Florida